Chứt (Chut, Cheut) or Rục-Sách is a dialect cluster spoken by the Chứt people of Vietnam, with a smaller population of some 450 speakers in neighbouring Khammouane Province, Laos. It is a Vietic language that may be most closely related to Arem.

Chứt has the four-way register system like Thavung augmented with pitch.  Unlike the Vietnamese language, Chứt still allows presyllables with a minor vowel, such as caku:4 "bear" (cf. Vietnamese gấu).

References

Ta Long (1975). "About the human community relationship between the three groups of 'Machines', Ruc, Books". In Vietnam Social Science Commission: Institute of Ethnology. On the issue of identifying the minority population in northern Vietnam, p. 518-530. Hanoi: Social science publisher.

External links
 The Chứt 05:06 PM 21/01/2016
 Người Chứt Committee on Ethnic Minority Affairs 03:44 PM 04/11/2015

Languages of Vietnam
Languages of Laos
Vietic languages